Cholera toxin (also known as choleragen and sometimes abbreviated to CTX, Ctx or CT) is an AB5 multimeric protein complex secreted by the bacterium Vibrio cholerae. CTX is responsible for the massive, watery diarrhea characteristic of cholera infection. It is a member of the heat-labile enterotoxin family.

History
Cholera toxin was discovered in 1959 by Indian microbiologist Sambhu Nath De.

Structure

The complete toxin is a hexamer made up of a single copy of the A subunit (part A, enzymatic), and five copies of the B subunit (part B, receptor binding), denoted as AB5. Subunit B binds while subunit A activates the G protein which activates adenylate cyclase. The three-dimensional structure of the toxin was determined using X-ray crystallography by Zhang et al. in 1995.

The five B subunits—each weighing 11 kDa, form a five-membered ring. The A subunit which is 28 kDa, has two important segments. The A1 portion of the chain (CTA1) is a globular enzyme payload that ADP-ribosylates G proteins, while the A2 chain (CTA2) forms an extended alpha helix which sits snugly in the central pore of the B subunit ring.

This structure is similar in shape, mechanism, and sequence to the heat-labile enterotoxin secreted by some strains of the Escherichia coli bacterium.

Pathogenesis
Cholera toxin acts by the following mechanism: First, the B subunit ring of the cholera toxin binds to GM1 gangliosides on the surface of target cells. If a cell lacks GM1, the toxin most likely binds to other types of glycans, such as Lewis Y and Lewis X, attached to proteins instead of lipids. Once bound, the entire toxin complex is endocytosed by the cell and the reduction of a disulfide bridge releases the cholera toxin A1 (CTA1) chain. The endosome is moved to the Golgi apparatus, where the A1 protein is recognized by the endoplasmic reticulum (ER) chaperone, protein disulfide isomerase. The A1 chain is then unfolded and delivered to the membrane, where Ero1 triggers the release of the A1 protein by oxidation of protein disulfide isomerase complex. As the A1 protein moves from the ER into the cytoplasm by the Sec61 channel, it refolds and avoids deactivation as a result of ubiquitination.

CTA1 is then free to bind with a human partner protein called ARF6 (ADP-ribosylation factor 6); binding to Arf6 drives a change in the shape of CTA1 which exposes its active site and enables its catalytic activity. The CTA1 fragment catalyses ADP-ribosylation of the Gs alpha subunit (Gαs) proteins using NAD. The ADP-ribosylation causes the Gαs subunit to lose its catalytic activity of GTP hydrolysis into GDP + Pi, thus maintaining Gαs in its activated state. Increased Gαs activation leads to increased adenylate cyclase activity, which increases the intracellular concentration of 3',5'-cyclic AMP (cAMP) to more than 100-fold over normal and over-activates cytosolic PKA. These active PKA then phosphorylate the cystic fibrosis transmembrane conductance regulator (CFTR) chloride channel proteins, which leads to ATP-mediated efflux of chloride ions and leads to secretion of H2O, Na+, K+, and HCO3− into the intestinal lumen. In addition, the entry of Na+ and consequently the entry of water into enterocytes are diminished. The combined effects result in rapid fluid loss from the intestine, up to 2 liters per hour, leading to severe dehydration and other factors associated with cholera, including a rice-water stool.

The pertussis toxin (also an AB5 protein) produced by Bordetella pertussis acts in a similar manner with the exception that it ADP-ribosylates the Gαi subunit, rendering it unable to inhibit cAMP production.

Origin
The gene encoding the cholera toxin was introduced into V. cholerae by horizontal gene transfer. Virulent strains of V. cholerae hold a virus known as a CTXφ Bacteriophage.

Applications
Because the B subunit appears to be relatively non-toxic, researchers have found a number of applications for it in cell and molecular biology. It is routinely used as a neuronal tracer.

Treatment of cultured rodent neural stem cells with cholera toxin induces changes in the localization of the transcription factor Hes3 and increases their numbers.

GM1 gangliosides are found in lipid rafts on the cell surface. B subunit complexes labelled with fluorescent tags or subsequently targeted with antibodies can be used to identify rafts.

Vaccine
There are currently two vaccines for cholera: Dukoral and Shanchol. Both vaccines use whole killed V. cholerae cells however, Dukoral also contains recombinant cholera toxin β (rCTB). Some studies suggest that the inclusion of rCTB may improve vaccine efficacy in young children (2-10) and increase the duration of protection. This is countered by the costs of protecting and storing rCTB against degradation.

Vaccine adjuvant
Another application of the CTB subunit may be as a vaccine adjuvant to other vaccines. It has been shown that coupling CTB and antigens improves the response of the vaccine. Currently the adjuvant potential of CTB has been shown in large animal models so further research is needed. This may allow for CTB to be used as an adjuvant for vaccinating against many kinds of diseases. This may include bacterial and viral infections, allergy and diabetes. Of note, as CTB has shown to induce mucosal humoral immune responses, vaccines against mucosal viruses such as HIV are a potential target.

Membrane biology

Lipid rafts
Since cholera toxin has been shown to preferentially bind to GM1 gangliosides, this characteristic can be utilized for membrane studies. Lipid rafts are difficult to study as they vary in size and lifetime, as well being part of an extremely dynamic component of cells. Using cholera toxin β as a marker, we can get a better understanding of the properties and functions of lipid rafts.

Endocytosis
Endocytosis is broadly divided into clathrin-dependent and clathrin-independent process, and the cholera toxin utilizes both pathways. Cholera toxin has been shown to enter cells via endocytosis in multiple pathways. These pathways include caveolae, clathrin-coated pits, clathrin-independent carriers (CLICs), and GPI-Enriched Endocytic Compartments (GEECs) pathway, ARF6-mediated endocytosis and Fast Endophilin-Mediated Endocytosis (FEME). How cholera toxin triggers these endocytosis pathways is not fully understood, but the fact that cholera toxin triggers these pathways shows the use of the toxin as an important marker to investigate these mechanisms.

Retrograde trafficking
One of the most important aspects of cholera toxin is the retrograde traffic mechanism that transports the toxin from the cell membrane back to the trans-Golgi network and the endoplasmic reticulum. Since both cholera toxin and GM1 species can be tagged with a fluorescent tags, the mechanism of retrograde traffic can be monitored. This opens up the potential to monitor the mechanism in real time. This may open up new discoveries on how intracellular transport works and how protein and lipid sorting work in the endocytotic pathway.

See also
 Enterotoxin
 Ganglioside

References

External links
 De, Sambhu Nath. Enterotoxicity of bacteria-free culture filtrate of Vibrio cholerae. Nature. 30 May 1959. 183:1533–4.
 
 
 
 
 

Bacterial proteins
AB5 toxins
Toxic enzymes